Aesculus hippocastanum, the horse chestnut, is a species of flowering plant in the maple, soapberry and lychee family Sapindaceae. It is a large, deciduous, synoecious (hermaphroditic-flowered) tree. It is also called horse-chestnut, European horsechestnut, buckeye, and conker tree. It is not to be confused with the Spanish chestnut, Castanea sativa, which is a tree in another family, Fagaceae.

Description
On old trees, the outer branches are often pendulous with curled-up tips. The leaf scars left on twigs after the leaves have fallen have a distinctive horseshoe shape, complete with seven "nails". Its pollens are not poisonous for honey bees. Usually only 1–5 fruits develop on each panicle. The shell is a green, spiky capsule containing one (rarely two or three) nut-like seeds called conkers or horse-chestnuts.

Etymology
The common name horse chestnut originates from the similarity of the leaves and fruits to sweet chestnuts, Castanea sativa (a tree in a different family, the Fagaceae), together with the alleged observation that the fruit or seeds could help panting or coughing horses.

Although it is sometimes known as buckeye, for the resemblance of the seed to a deer's eye, the term buckeye is more commonly used for New World members of the genus Aesculus.

Distribution and habitat
Aesculus hippocastanum is native to a small area in the Pindus Mountains mixed forests and Balkan mixed forests of South East Europe. and endemic to the Balkans. However, it can be found in many parts of Europe as far north as Harstad north of the Arctic Circle in Norway, and Gästrikland in Sweden, as well as in many parks and cities in the northern United States and Canada.

The compact native population of horse chestnut in Bulgaria is distinct from the horse chestnut forests of northern Greece, western North Macedonia and Albania. It is limited to an area of 9 ha in the Preslav Mountain north of the Balkan Mountains, in the valleys of the Dervishka and Lazarska rivers. Bulgaria's relict horse chestnut forests are critically endangered at the national level and protected as part of the Dervisha Managed Nature Reserve.

Uses
It is widely cultivated in streets and parks throughout the temperate world, and has been particularly successful in places like Ireland, Great Britain and New Zealand, where they are commonly found in parks, streets and avenues. Cultivation for its spectacular spring flowers is successful in a wide range of temperate climatic conditions provided summers are not too hot, with trees being grown as far north as Edmonton, Alberta, Canada, the Faroe Islands, Reykjavík, Iceland and Harstad, Norway.

In Britain and Ireland, the seeds are used for the popular children's game conkers. During the First World War, there was a campaign to ask for everyone (including children) to collect the seeds and donate them to the government. The conkers were used as a source of starch for fermentation using the Clostridium acetobutylicum method devised by Chaim Weizmann to produce acetone for use as a solvent for the production of cordite, which was then used in military armaments. Weizmann's process could use any source of starch, but the government chose to ask for conkers to avoid causing starvation by depleting food sources. But conkers were found to be a poor source, and the factory only produced acetone for three months; however, they were collected again in the Second World War for the same reason.  In the US state of Ohio, the seeds of the related Aesculus glabra are called 'buckeyes' and give rise to one of the state's symbols and nicknames, the Buckeye State.

The seeds, especially those that are young and fresh, are slightly poisonous, containing alkaloid saponins and glucosides. Although not dangerous to touch, they cause sickness when eaten; consumed by horses, they can cause tremors and lack of coordination.

The horse-chestnut is a favourite subject for bonsai.

Though the seeds are said to repel spiders there is little evidence to support these claims. The presence of saponin may repel insects but it is not clear whether this is effective on spiders.

Aesculus hippocastanum is affected by the leaf-mining moth Cameraria ohridella, whose larvae feed on horse chestnut leaves. The moth was described from North Macedonia where the species was discovered in 1984 but took 18 years to reach Britain.

In Germany, they are commonly planted in beer gardens, particularly in Bavaria. Prior to the advent of mechanical refrigeration, brewers would dig cellars for lagering. To further protect the cellars from the summer heat, they would plant horse chestnut trees, which have spreading, dense canopies but shallow roots which would not intrude on the caverns. The practice of serving beer at these sites evolved into the modern beer garden.

An inexpensive detergent for washing clothes can be made at home from conkers, and this is said to be an environmentally benign ('eco-friendly') detergent.

Traditional medicine

The seed extract standardized to around 20 percent aescin (escin) is possibly useful in traditional medicine for its effect on venous tone. A Cochrane Review suggested that horse chestnut seed extract may be an efficacious and safe short-term treatment for chronic venous insufficiency, but definitive randomized controlled trials had not been conducted to confirm the efficacy.

Safety

There is risk of acute kidney injury, "when patients, who had undergone cardiac surgery were given high doses of horse chestnut extract i.v. for postoperative oedema. The phenomenon was dose dependent as no alteration in kidney function was recorded with 340 μg/kg, mild kidney function impairment developed with 360 μg/kg and acute kidney injury with 510 μg/kg".

Raw horse chestnut seed, leaf, bark and flower are toxic due to the presence of aesculin and should not be ingested. Horse chestnut seed is classified by the FDA as an unsafe herb. The glycoside and saponin constituents are considered toxic.

Other chemicals
Quercetin 3,4'-diglucoside, a flavonol glycoside can also be found in horse chestnut seeds. Leucocyanidin, leucodelphinidin and procyanidin A2 can also be found in horse chestnut.

Anne Frank tree
A fine specimen of the horse-chestnut was the Anne Frank tree in the centre of Amsterdam, which she mentioned in her diary and which survived until August 2010, when a heavy wind blew it over. Eleven young specimens, sprouted from seeds from this tree, were transported to the United States. After a long quarantine in Indianapolis, each tree was shipped off to a new home at a notable museum or institution in the United States, such as the 9/11 Memorial Park, Central H.S. in Little Rock, and two Holocaust Centers. One of them was planted outdoors in March 2013 in front of the Children's Museum of Indianapolis, where they were originally quarantined.

Symbol of Kyiv
The horse chestnut tree is one of the symbols of Kyiv, the capital of Ukraine.

Diseases

 Bleeding canker. Half of all horse-chestnuts in Great Britain are now showing symptoms to some degree of this potentially lethal bacterial infection.
 Guignardia leaf blotch, caused by the fungus Guignardia aesculi
 Wood rotting fungi, e.g. such as Armillaria and Ganoderma
 Horse chestnut scale, caused by the insect Pulvinaria regalis
 Horse-chestnut leaf miner, Cameraria ohridella, a leaf mining moth. The larvae of this moth species bore through the leaves of the horse chestnut, causing premature colour changes and leaf loss.
 Phytophthora bleeding canker, a fungal infection.

Gallery

Other sources

References

hippocastanum
Flora of Bulgaria
Flora of Greece
Flora of North Macedonia
Garden plants of Europe
Medicinal plants of Europe
Ornamental trees
Plants described in 1753
Plants used in bonsai
Trees of Europe
Trees of humid continental climate
Trees of Mediterranean climate
Taxa named by Carl Linnaeus